Rubidograptis is a genus of moths belonging to the family Tortricidae.

Species
Rubidograptis praeconia (Meyrick, 1937)
Rubidograptis regulus Razowski, 1981

See also
List of Tortricidae genera

References

  1981: Acta zool. cracov. 25: 324.
  2010: An annotated catalogue of the types of Tortricidae (Lepidoptera) in the collection of the Royal Museum for Central Africa (Tervuren, Belgium) with descriptions of new genera and new species. Zootaxa 2469: 1-77. Abstract: .

External links
Tortricid.net

Tortricini
Tortricidae genera